The Lang Trang is a cave formation located in Vietnam. Palaeontological remains found in the cave date from the Pleistocene period.

See also 
 List of fossil sites

Further reading
  (1993); Wildlife of Gondwana. Reed. 
  (1996); "The fossil mammal fauna of the Lang Trang caves, Vietnam, compared with Southeast Asian fossil and recent mammal faunas: the geographical implications", Bulletin of the Indo-Pacific Prehistory Association, Vol. 14.

Cenozoic paleontological sites of Asia
Caves of Vietnam